Meerle is a village in the Belgian municipality of Hoogstraten in the province of Antwerp. As of 2021, it has about 3,871 inhabitants.

History 
The village was first mentioned in 1266 as Meerle, and means "open forest near a lake/pond". The Thorn Abbey used to have many possessions in Meerle, and the village originally belonged to the Land of Breda. During the 14th century, the possessions were gradually transferred to the Lord of Hoogstraten. After the French Revolution, Meerle became an independent municipality. The village was mainly an agricultural village with an emphasis on livestock. During the 20th century, it increasingly became a residential town. Meerle was an independent municipality until 1977 when it was merged into Hoogstraten.

Gallery

References

External links 
 
  Official website of Hoogstraten

Sub-municipalities of Hoogstraten
Former municipalities of Antwerp Province
Populated places in Antwerp Province